Mednick is a surname. Notable people with the surname include:

 Adam Mednick (born 1966), Swedish golfer
 Martha Mednick (1929–2020), American psychologist
 Murray Mednick (born 1939), American playwright and poet
 Sara Mednick, American sleep researcher
 Sarnoff A. Mednick (1928–2015), American psychologist

See also
 MEDNIK syndrome
 Melnik (disambiguation)